Regent Square may refer to:

Places
Regent Square (London), a public square and street in the borough of Camden, London
Regent Square (Pittsburgh), a neighbourhood in Pittsburgh, Pennsylvania

Other
Regent Square (hymn tune), a hymn tune written by Henry Smart